Mueang Chanthaburi is the capital district (amphoe mueang) of Chanthaburi province, eastern Thailand.

Geography
Neighboring districts are (from the north clockwise) Khao Khitchakut, Makham, Khlung, Laem Sing, and Tha Mai of Chanthaburi Province.

Administration

Central administration 
Mueang Chanthaburi is divided into 11 sub-districts (tambons), which are further subdivided into 98 administrative villages (mubans).

Local administration 
There are three towns (thesaban mueangs) in the district:
 Chanthaburi consisting of sub-districts Talat and Wat Mai.
 Chanthanimit consisting of sub-district Chanthanimit.
 Tha Chang consisting of parts of sub-district Tha Chang.

There are seven sub-district municipalities (thesaban tambons) in the district:
 Khai Noen Wong consisting of parts of sub-district Bang Kacha.
 Salaeng consisting of sub-district Salaeng.
 Phlapphla consisting of parts of sub-district Phlapphla.
 Bang Kacha consisting of parts of sub-district Bang Kacha.
 Phlapphla Narai consisting of parts of sub-districts Khlong Narai and Phlapphla.
 Nong Bua consisting of parts of sub-district Nong Bua.
 Ko Khwang consisting of sub-district Ko Khwang.

There are four sub-district administrative organizations (SAO) in the district:
 Khlong Narai consisting of parts of sub-district Khlong Narai.
 Khom Bang consisting of sub-district Khom Bang.
 Tha Chang consisting of parts of sub-district Tha Chang.
 Nong Bua consisting of parts of sub-district Nong Bua.

References

External links
amphoe.com

Chanthaburi
Mueang Chanthaburi